Le Grand Journal was a French nightly news and talk show television program that aired on Canal+ every weekday evening from 19:10 to 20:20. It debuted on August 30, 2004 and was created and hosted by Michel Denisot, succeeded by Antoine de Caunes and then later by Maïtena Biraben. Victor Robert took on the reins from 2016 to the program's end in 2017. Originally a one-hour program, it expanded to two hours in 2005. Even though the program was broadcast on the premium channel Canal+, it was a non-encrypted program.

The program features news, talk, weather and comedy. It is produced by KM Productions for Canal+ and broadcast from the Studios Rive Gauche on Quai André-Citroën in Paris.

History

Created in 2004 by producer-director Renaud Le Van Kim, the show was originally composed of one block broadcast from 19:05 to 19:55, usually live except on Fridays. The show benefitted from audiences from all of Canal+'s free time slots watching, in addition to the extension of Digital terrestrial television, which allowed new households access to the channel. The show took up the time slot initially reserved for the show 20 h 10 pétantes (French for "20:10 sharp") at the beginning of the 2005 season; Since then, Stéphanie Bern's show has only been diffused on Fridays and Saturdays, under the name Vendredi pétantes et Samedi pétantes. The second part was then titled Le Grand Journal, la suite and was broadcast from 20:10 to 20:40. Since September 2011, La Suite was broadcast from 20:30 to 20:55.

During season 9, La Suite was copresented by Michel Denisot and Daphné Bürki. The show lost 13% of their audience, which it blamed on the fact that it was played at the same time as C à vous on France 5, Vous êtes en direct on NRJ 12, and Touche pas à mon poste on D8.

On June 6, 2013, Michel Denisot announced that he would quit the show after 9 years at the head of the talk-show. On June 17, 2013, the name of the new presenter was announced to be Antoine de Caunes. He was a former presenter on Canal+ from 1987 to 1995 participating in the success of the show Nulle part ailleurs then at the César Award presentation ceremony.

At the beginning of February 2017, a press conference had stated that the program might possibly stop production  on March or April due to a decline in ratings, and that the leaders of Canal + would already be working on the successor to LGJ. The channel announced its final run on Friday 13 February, followed by two weeks of reruns until March 17.

Team 
Legend:
 Currently Previously Invited during one or multiple broadcasts  Joker a broadcast

Seasons

Season 1 (2004–2005) 

From Monday to Friday at 6:50 pm to 7:55 pm 
 Isabelle Morini-Bosc : television
 Stéphane Blakowski : literature
 Laurent Weil : cinema
 Marie Drucker : flash informations
 Mademoiselle Agnès : fashion
 Eric Dahan : music
 Alexandre Cammas : Leisure and art of living
 Guy Birenbaum : press review
 Yann Barthès : Le Petit Journal People
 Ahmed Meguini Global Justice Chronicle
 Frédérique Bel : La minute blonde by Dorothy Doll

Season 2 (2005–2006) 

From Monday to Thursday from 7:10 pm to 7:50 pm and the rest from 8:10 pm to 8:50 pm
 Ariane Massenet : médias
 Frédéric Beigbeder : literature
 Laurent Weil : cinema
 Tania Bruna-Rosso : music
 Yann Barthès : Le Petit Journal Actu and Le Petit Journal People
 Atmen Kelif
 Bruno Donnet : Le Petit papier
 Frédérique Bel : La minute blonde by Dorothy Doll
 L'anniversaire par La bande à Fifi
 Arnaud Tsamere : Weather

Season 3 (2006–2007) 

From Monday to Friday from 7:10 pm to 7:50 pm and the rest from 8:10 pm to 8:50 pm
 Ariane Massenet : medias
 Frédéric Beigbeder : literature who quit the team in May 2007
 Laurent Weil : cinema
 Tania Bruna-Rosso : music
 Jean-Michel Aphatie : Politics
 Yann Barthès : Le Petit Journal Actu and Le Petit Journal People
 Omar and Fred : Le Service après-vente des émissions
 Bruno Donnet : Le Petit papier
 Thomas N'Gijol : Le Top 5
 Louise Bourgoin : Weather
 La bande à Fifi : L'anniversaire

Season 4 (2007–2008) 

From Monday to Friday from 7:10 pm to 7:50 pm and the rest from 8:10 pm to 8:50 pm
 Ariane Massenet : medias
 Ali Baddou : literature
 Laurent Weil : cinema
 Tania Bruna-Rosso : music
 Jean-Michel Aphatie : politic
 Yann Barthès : Le Petit Journal Actu and Le Petit Journal People where he now directly intervenes.
 Omar and Fred : Le Service après-vente des émissions
 Bruno Donnet : La Petite Question and La Petite semaine
 Thomas N'Gijol : top 5
 Le Dating de Max Boublil (September 2007)
 Louise Bourgoin : weather
 Damien Cabrespines : Cinema (" L'instant critique ") and subjects
 Frédéric Beigbeder (only at Cannes For the Film Festival) : cinema
 Didier Allouch (only at Cannes For the Film Festival) : Market of Cinema

Season 5 (2008–2009) 

From Monday to Friday from 7:05 pm to 7:50 pm and the rest from 8:10 pm to 8:45 pm
 Ariane Massenet : Medias
 Jean-Michel Aphatie : Politics
 Louise Bourgoin : Without pretension on Friday and some sketches in "Les bonus de Guillaume”
 Ali Baddou : Literature and culture
 Yann Barthès : Le Petit Journal Actu and Le Petit Journal People, both are live.
 Damien Cabrespines : Cinema (" L'instant critique ") and subjects
 Élise Chassaing : Cinema
 Guillaume Gallienne : Les bonus de Guillaume
 Tania Bruna-Rosso : Music, La Bataille Musicale (avec Mouloud, le vendredi)
 Mouloud Achour : The new movements, La Bataille Musicale (avec Tania, le vendredi)
 Omar and Fred : Le Service après-vente des émissions
 Pauline Lefèvre : Weather
 Bruno Donnet : La Petite Question and La Petite Semaine
 Marie Colmant : International Press Review (Fridays)
 Anne Sinclair and Laurence Haïm Did equal parties for the team during the American Presidential Elections 
 Frédéric Beigbeder (only at Cannes For the Film Festival) : cinema
 Laurent Weil (only at Cannes For the Film Festival) : Red Carpet

Season 6 (2009–2010) 

From Monday to Friday from 7:05 pm to 7:50 pm and the rest from 8:10 pm to 8:45 pm
 Ariane Massenet : Medias
 Jean-Michel Aphatie : Politics
 Ali Baddou : Literature and culture
 Pauline Lefèvre : Weather
 Yann Barthès : Le Petit Journal Actu and Le Petit Journal People, both are live.
 Élise Chassaing : Cinema
 Guillaume Gallienne : Les bonus de Guillaume
 Tania Bruna-Rosso : Music
 Mouloud Achour : The new movements
 Damien Cabrespines : Cinema ("L'instant critique")
 Omar and Fred : The Service après-vente des émissions
 Kamel Boutayeb : Le tour de Magie
 Bruno Donnet : La Petite Question and La Petite Semaine
 Laurent Weil (only at Cannes For the Film Festival) : Red Carpet

Season 7 (2010–2011) 

From Monday to Friday from 7:05 pm to 7:50 pm and the rest from 8:10 pm to 8:45 pm
 Ariane Massenet : Médias, Le Bureau de l'Info
 Jean-Michel Aphatie : Politics
 Ali Baddou : Literature and culture (of the rubric Ali a lu), official joker officiel of Michel Denisot
 Charlotte Le Bon : Weather
 Tania Bruna-Rosso : Music, L'Instant T (review of the latest buzz and pop-culture)
 Mouloud Achour : The latest movements, Daily Mouloud (incongruous review of a personality)
 Yann Barthès : Le Petit Journal (only in the first, longer, part)
 Damien Cabrespines : Le Crash Test
 Thomas N'Gijol : Humorous comments on political news of the week. (Only on Friday)
 Omar and Fred : The Service après-vente des émissions
 Kamel Boutayeb : Le tour de Magie
 Bruno Donnet : La Petite Semaine and Rédacteur en Chef
 Lucienne Moreau : Reporter au Petit Journal
 Laurent Weil (only at Cannes For the Film Festival) and for the deliver of the César Awards) : red carpet

Season 8 (2011–2012) 

From Monday to Friday from 7:10 pm to 8:05 pm and the rest from 8:30 pm to 8:55 pm
The columnists for season 2011–12:
 Ariane Massenet : medias
 China Moses : music
 Solweig Rediger-Lizlow : Weather
 Mouloud Achour : The daily mouloud 
 Omar and Fred : Le Service après-vente des émissions
 Jean-Michel Aphatie : Politics
 Bruno Donnet : La petite semaine
 Damien Cabrespines : Le crash test and La Short List
 Ollivier Pourriol : culture and literature
 Kamel Boutayeb : Le Tour de Magie
 Kyan Khojandi : Bref (mini-series, from Monday to Thursday)
 Charlotte Le Bon and Alex Lutz : L'envers du décor (sketches, Friday) Part of  'Petit Journal’
 Vincent Glad: Campagne présidentielle 2.0 (chronique Web, depuis janvier 2012)
 Stéphane Bak, Laurent Weill and Elise Chassaing: Only present during the Film Festival)

Season 9 (2012–2013) 
From Monday to Friday from 7:10 pm to 8:05 pm and the rest from 8:30 pm to 8:55 pm
The columnists for season 2012–13:
 Daphné Bürki
 Jean-Michel Aphatie : politics
 Mouloud Achour : Chez Mouloud (at the start of the season, he had his own platform but appeared on Grand Journal)
 Vincent Glad : Web
 Elise Chassaing : Cinema
 Doria Tillier: Weather
 Augustin Trapenard: Literary columnist
 Chris Esquerre: Humor columnist (the results of the week)
 Sébastien Thoen: Humor columnist 
 Kamel Boutayeb: Le Tour de Magie
 Stéphane Bak: Humor Columnist (when?)
 10 minutes à perdre (to lose): La Question de la fin  (Baptiste Lorber, James Darle and Grandpamini, at the start of the season), then Shitcom (Fridays, ended 2012)
 Nawell Madani : Humor columnist (when?)
 Alice Belaïdi and Clémence Faure : Sophie et Sophie
 Jérôme Niel and inviteds : Groom Service (During the Film Festival)

Season 10 (2013–2014) 

From Monday to Friday from 7:10 pm to 8:25 pm
The columnists of season 2013–14:

 Jean-Michel Aphatie : politics
 Doria Tillier: Weather
 Augustin Trapenard: Literary columnist
  Jeannette Bougrab
 Arié Elmaleh: humor (From August 26, 2013 till February 2014)
 Hélène Jouan
 Karim Rissouli: Political columnist: Karim a dit
 Sébastien Thoen : Humor columnist
 Valérie Amarou
 Pendant ce temps (Kevin Razy, Inna Modja, Vanessa Guide, Marc Jarousseau alias Kemar, Julien Pestel) : mini-sketchs (From Monday to Thursday). Transferred in the 'Before' in January 2014.
 Connasse (Camille Cottin) mini-sketches (Tuesday and Friday at 8:15 since January 2014). This short program passed on Before au Grand Journal in exchange for Pendant ce temps.
 Les Tutos (Jérôme Niel alias La Ferme Jérôme) : mini-sketches (Friday at 8:15
 Le Rappel Des Titres (Monsieur Poulpe and Vanessa Guide) : Fake journal (From Monday to Thursday at 8:15)
 Casting(s) (Pierre Niney): Short Program (From Monday to Friday at 8:15during Le Grand Journal De Cannes)
 Delphine Baril : humor
 Anne Nivat
 Maïtena Biraben who is the joker of Antoine de Caunes.

 Other
In September 2013, the broadcast Le Before du Grand Journal by Thomas Thouroude was created; It was distributed just before Le Grand Journal at 6:05.

Season 11 (2014–2015) 

From Monday to Friday from 7:05 pm to 8:20 pm
The columnists of season 2014–15:

 Alison Wheeler and Monsieur Poulpe (after Raphaëlle Dupire) : weather
 Jean-Michel Aphatie : politics
 Karim Rissouli : Political columnist
 Augustin Trapenard: Literary columnist
 Natacha Polony : politics
 Mathilde Serrell : culture
 Connasse (Camille Cottin) : Short Program
 Le JT de l'invited (Monsieur Poulpe and Vanessa Guide, Alison Wheeler in replacement) : Fake journal (Monday to Thursday at:15)
 Speakerine (Jérôme Niel) : Short Program
 Carte de Presque (Alison Wheeler) : Short Program
 Nora Hamzawi : Humor columnist
 Sébastien Thoen : Public opinion Spokesperson (Humor columnist)

References

French television news shows